Bispetorv (lit. Bishop's Square) may refer to:

 Bispetorv, Copenhagen, a square in Copenhagen, Denmark
 Bispetorv, Aarhus, a square in Aarhus, Denmark